The Kings of Uí Cheinnselaig were a branch of the Laigin who came to dominate southern Leinster, known also as Laigin Desgabair. They were semi-independent of their overlords in the north of Leinster and sometimes provided rulers of all Leinster.

Kings of Uí Cheinnselaig

The following list is a partial list of kings of the Uí Cheinnselaig compiled from the king list in the Book of Leinster and records kept in the Annals of Ulster.

 Énnae Cennsalach 
 Crimthann mac Énnai (died 483)
 ........
 Nath Í mac Crimthainn
 Óengus mac Feidlimid
 Fáelán Senchustul
 Éogan Cáech mac Nath Í 
 Muiredach mac Óengusa
 Fáelán mac Síláin
 Echu mac Muiredaig
 Forannán mac Máel Udir
 ..........
 Brandub mac Echach (died 605)
 Rónán mac Colmáin (died 624)
 Crundmáel Bolg Luatha mac Áedo (died 628)
 Colgu Bolg Luatha mac Crundmaíl (died 647)
 Crundmáel Erbuilc mac Rónáin (died 656)
 Cummascach mac Rónáin (died 672)
 Bran Ua Máele Dúin (died 712)
 Cú Chongelt mac Con Mella (died 724?) 
 Laidcnén mac Con Mella (died 727)
 Élothach mac Fáelchon (died circa 734)
 Áed mac Colggen (died 738)
 Sechnassach mac Colggen (died 746/747)
 Cathal mac Cináeda (died 758)
 Donngal mac Laidcnén (died 761)
 Dub Calgaid mac Laidcnén (died 769) 
 Cennselach mac Brain (died 770)
 Eterscél mac Áeda (died 778)
 Cairpre mac Laidcnén (died 793)
 Cellach Tosach mac Donngaile (died 809)
 Cathal mac Dúnlainge (died 819)
 Cairpre mac Cathail (died 844)
 Echtigern mac Guaire (died 853) 
 Cellach mac Guaire (died 858)
 Tadg mac Diarmata (died 865)
 Donnacán mac Cétfada (died 869)
 Cairpre mac Diarmata (died 876)
 Riacán mac Echtigern (died 893)
 Fáelán mac Guaire (died 894)
 Dub Gilla mac Etarscéoil (died 903)
 Tadg mac Fáeláin (died 922 )
 Cináed mac Cairpri (died 935)
 Bruatur mac Duibgilla (died 937)
 Cellach mac Cináeda (died 947)
  Echtigern mac Cináeda (died 953)
 Donnchad mac Taidg (died 965)
 Domnall mac Cellaig (died 974)
 Muiredach mac Riain (died 978)
 Bruatar mac Echtigern (died 982)
 Diarmait mac Domnaill (died 996)
 Donnchad Mael na mBó (died 1006)
 Diarmait mac Máel na mBó (died 1072)

See also
 Kings of Leinster

References

Book of Leinster, formerly Lebar na Núachongbála, section 27, Ríg Hua Cendselaig; http://www.ucc.ie/celt/published/G800011A/text027.html
 Annals of Ulster at CELT: Corpus of Electronic Texts at University College Cork
 Byrne, Francis John (2001), Irish Kings and High-Kings, Dublin: Four Courts Press, 
 Book of Leinster,Rig Hua Cendselaig at CELT: Corpus of Electronic Texts at University College Cork

Kings of Leinster
Kings of Uí Cheinnselaig